The Information Warfare Division (IWD) is a division of the Department of Defence tasked with defending Australia's national interests in the information environment.

Units
The Information Warfare Division contains the following branches:
 Joint Integrated Capabilities Branch (JIC) 
 Joint Space Services (JSS)
 Joint Command, Control, Communications and Computers (JC4)
 Joint Information Warfare (JIW).

See also
 List of cyber warfare forces

References

Department of Defence (Australia)